Yoonkyung Lee is a professor of statistics at Ohio State University, and also holds a courtesy appointment in computer science and engineering at Ohio State. Her research takes a statistical approach to kernel methods, dimensionality reduction, and regularization in machine learning.

Professional career

Lee earned bachelor's and master's degrees in computer science and statistics from Seoul National University in Korea in 1994 and 1996. She completed her Ph.D. in statistics in 2002 at the University of Wisconsin–Madison, under the supervision of Grace Wahba and Yi Lin, with a dissertation about support vector machines and their applications to microarray and satellite data. She joined the Ohio State faculty in 2002 and was promoted to full professor in 2016.

Recognition
In 2015, Lee was elected as a Fellow of the American Statistical Association "for fundamental and influential research on the multicategory support vector machine; for work at the edge of statistics and computer science and building a bridge between the statistics and machine learning communities; and for editorial and program committee service to the profession."

References

External links
Home page

Year of birth missing (living people)
Living people
American computer scientists
South Korean computer scientists
South Korean women computer scientists
American statisticians
South Korean statisticians
Women statisticians
Seoul National University alumni
University of Wisconsin–Madison College of Letters and Science alumni
Ohio State University faculty
Fellows of the American Statistical Association
21st-century South Korean women scientists
21st-century South Korean scientists
American women computer scientists
21st-century American scientists
21st-century American women scientists